Mary Bergin (born ) is an Irish folk musician who is widely acknowledged as one of the great masters of the tin whistle.  She plays in both the Irish Traditional and Baroque styles.

Biography 
Mary Bergin was born in Shankill, County Dublin, Ireland. Her parents Joe and Máire were melodeon and fiddle players, respectively. Mary started learning to play the tin whistle at the age of nine.

Bergin won the All Ireland tin whistle championship in 1970. Her two virtuosic recordings of the solo tin whistle, Feadóga Stáin (1979) and Feadóga Stáin 2 (1993), have been critically cited as "outstanding and unequalled".

Bergin moved to An Spidéal, County Galway, in the early 1970s and played with many of the up-and-coming stars of the Irish music scene, notably De Danann and Ceoltóri Laighin. She is currently a member of the group Dordán, who perform Irish traditional music and Baroque music with pieces by George Frideric Handel, Henry Purcell and a tune from Johann Sebastian Bach's Little Notebook for Anna Magdalena Bach.

In addition to releasing two solo albums, which aided the popularisation of modern traditional Irish tin whistle playing, and three albums with Dordán, Bergin has taught hundreds of students, in Ireland, across Europe, and in the United States, to play the whistle.

Playing style
Bergin was exposed to the music of many renowned musicians from an early age, but her style is particularly influenced by flute player Packie Duignan and the whistle playing of Willie Clancy.  She plays the whistle "left-handed", with the right hand covering the upper tone holes, unlike most whistle players who play with the left hand on top.

Bergin's playing is characterized by great feeling, technical virtuosity, and a respect for the music.  Music scholar Fintan Vallely has described her playing as "brightly ornamented but uncluttered", with "crisp articulation".  Writer and flute player Grey Larsen uses similar terms, describing her playing as "precise", "elegant", and "streamlined".

Discography

Mary Bergin
 Feadóga Stáin (1979)
 Feadóga Stáin 2 (1993)

Dordán
 Irish Traditional and Baroque Music (1 July 1991)
 Jigs to the Moon (18 October 1994)
 The Night Before...A Celtic Christmas (25 August 1998)
 Celtic Aire (13 July 1999)

References

Bibliography

External links
 
Mary Bergin's performance of Over the Bridge with comments and score
Official site

1949 births
Living people
Irish folk musicians
Irish tin whistle players
Musicians from County Dublin